Luis Pedro Figueroa Sepúlveda (born May 14, 1983) is a Chilean former footballer who played as a midfielder.

Club career
He was born in Concepción, and made his debut for U. de Concepción in 2002 (just 18 years old) and was bought by Universidad de Chile in 2005. In 2007, he signed for the Argentine club Club Atlético Banfield before returning to Chile in 2008 to play for Cobreloa. He then moved to Colo-Colo to play in the Clausura 2008.

Palmeiras
After playing against Palmeiras twice in the group stage of the Copa Libertadores 2009 he transferred to the Brazilian club in September 2009. His debut for Palmeiras was on a 2–1 win over Cruzeiro on September 24, 2009. And with good appearances with Palmeiras in 2009, Figueroa was the first choice player for right back position in the 2010 club's season. Unfortunately, Figueroa performed below it was expected from him due to leg injury in late February 2010. During recovery, Palmeiras announced the arrival of Vítor, who would be the first choice as right back following Figueroa's recovery. Palmeiras announced that they would not renew Figueroa's contract, expiring on 31 July 2010, and Figueroa moved back to Chile, this time joining Unión Española.

O'Higgins
In 2013, he won the Apertura 2013-14 with O'Higgins. In the tournament, he played in 15 of 18 matches, and scored two goals in the win 1:2 against Universidad Católica.

In 2014, he won the Supercopa de Chile against Deportes Iquique, and scored a goal at the 38 minutes in the match that won O'Higgins in the penalty shoot-out.

He participated with the club in the 2014 Copa Libertadores where they faced Deportivo Cali, Cerro Porteño and Lanús, being third and being eliminated in the group stage.

Coquimbo Unido
In 2020, he joined Coquimbo Unido for the 2020 Chilean Primera División, also playing in the 2020 Copa Sudamericana, but the Pirates were relegated to the Primera B for the 2021 season.

In June 2021, he announced his retirement from the football activity after having played for 22 years.

International career
Figueroa represented Chile U20 at the 2003 South American U-20 Championship and Chile U23 at the 2004 CONMEBOL Pre-Olympic Tournament. At senior level, he debuted in the national Chilean team in 2004 during the Copa América 2004 in Peru. Figueroa has also played friendlies during the 2006 and he scored his first goal for Chile against Paraguay (3–2 victory).

International goals

Honours

Club
Colo-Colo
Primera División (3): 2008 Clausura, 2015 Apertura, 2017 Transición
Copa Chile: 2016
Supercopa de Chile: 2017

O'Higgins
Primera División (1): Apertura 2013-14
Supercopa de Chile: 2014

Individual
O'Higgins
Primera División Ideal Team: 2013–14
Medalla Santa Cruz de Triana: 2014

References

External links
 
 Luis Figueroa at Football Lineups

1983 births
Living people
People from Concepción Province, Chile
People from Biobío Region
Chilean footballers
Association football wingers
Universidad de Concepción footballers
Universidad de Chile footballers
Arsenal de Sarandí footballers
Club Atlético Banfield footballers
Cobreloa footballers
Colo-Colo footballers
Sociedade Esportiva Palmeiras players
Unión Española footballers
S.C. Olhanense players
O'Higgins F.C. footballers
Coquimbo Unido footballers
Chile international footballers
Chile youth international footballers
Chile under-20 international footballers
Chilean expatriate footballers
Chilean Primera División players
Campeonato Brasileiro Série A players
Primeira Liga players
Primera B de Chile players
Expatriate footballers in Argentina
Chilean expatriate sportspeople in Argentina
Chilean expatriates in Argentina
Expatriate footballers in Brazil
Chilean expatriate sportspeople in Brazil
Chilean expatriates in Brazil
Expatriate footballers in Portugal
Chilean expatriate sportspeople in Portugal
Chilean expatriates in Portugal
2004 Copa América players